The 2003 Fenland District Council election took place on 1 May 2003 to elect members of Fenland District Council in Cambridgeshire, England. The whole council was up for election with boundary changes since the last election in 1999. The Conservative Party stayed in overall control of the council.

Election result
The results saw the Conservatives easily stay in control of the council taking 36 of the 40 seats, with Conservative candidates having been unopposed in 11 wards. The only ward where any other group won all of the seats was in Waterlees in Wisbech, where Labour took both seats.

14 Conservative candidates were unopposed at the election.

Ward results

References

2003 English local elections
2003
2000s in Cambridgeshire